Holy Trinity Church, Stanton-in-Peak is a Grade II listed parish church in the Church of England in Stanton in Peak, Derbyshire.

History

The church was built for William Pole Thornhill, who held the estate of Stanton Hall, Stanton in Peak. The foundation stone was laid by Mrs Thornhill in 1837 and it was opened worship by the Venerable Francis Hodgson DD, Archdeacon of Derby in September 1839. It was constituted a parish church, dedicated to the Holy Trinity, and consecrated with the adjoining cemetery by the Right Rev George Selwyn, DD, Bishop of Lichfield on 29 September 1875.

Parish status
The church is in a joint parish with
St Michael's Church, Birchover
St Michael and All Angels’ Church, Middleton-by-Youlgreave
All Saints’ Church, Youlgreave

Organ

The first organ was installed by Brindley & Foster in 1877, the gift of Mrs Thornhill Gell. A specification of the organ can be found on the National Pipe Organ Register.

See also
Listed buildings in Stanton, Derbyshire

References

External links

Church of England church buildings in Derbyshire
Grade II listed churches in Derbyshire
1875 establishments in England
Churches completed in 1875